OFI Crete B.C. (Greek: Ό.Φ.Η. K.A.E.) is a Greek professional basketball club that is located on the Greek island of Crete, in Heraklion. It is a part of the OFI Crete multi sports club. The club's full name is Club of Fans of Heraklion 1925 (Όμιλος Φιλάθλων Ηρακλείου 1925).

History
The club's parent athletic association, OFI Crete, was founded in 1925. The club's men's basketball team won the championship of the Greek 4th-tier level Greek C Basket League in 1998, and was promoted to the third-tier level Greek B Basket League. After that, it was relegated back down the Greek C Basket League, but it returned to the Greek B Basket League in 2008.

The next year, OFI was promoted to the 2nd-tier level Greek A2 Basket League, for first time. After a short fall back into the Greek B Basket League, the club returned to the Greek A2 Basket League, and remained there until 2015, when the club was withdrawn from the league due to financial problems.

Arena
The club plays its home games at the 1,000 seat Vardinogiannis Sports Center.

Honors

Divisional competitions
Greek 3rd Division Champion: (2011)
2× Greek 4th Division 2nd Group Champion: (1998, 2008)

Notable players

Head coaches

References

External links
OFI Crete Athletic Club Official website 
OFI Crete Basketball 
Eurobasket.com Team Profile

Basketball teams in Crete
Basketball teams in Heraklion
basketball